The 1918 Kansas gubernatorial election was held on November 5, 1918. Republican nominee Henry Justin Allen defeated Democratic nominee W. C. Lansdon with 66.39% of the vote.

General election

Candidates
Major party candidates 
Henry Justin Allen, Republican
W. C. Lansdon, Democratic

Other candidates
George W. Kleihege, Socialist

Results

References

1918
Kansas
Gubernatorial